American singer Hayley Kiyoko has released two studio albums, four extended plays, thirty-one singles (including eight as a featured artist) and eighth promotional singles. Kiyoko's debut EP, A Belle to Remember, was released in March 2013. Her next EP, This Side of Paradise, was released in February 2015 and spawned three singles: "This Side of Paradise", "Girls Like Girls", and "Cliff's Edge". In 2016, she released the singles "Gravel to Tempo", and "One Bad Night", included on the EP Citrine which was released later that year. In 2017, two new singles, titled "Sleepover" and "Feelings", were released. These were included, along with the follow-up single "Curious" on Kiyoko's debut album Expectations, which was released on March 30, 2018.

Albums

Extended plays

Singles

As lead artist

As featured artist

Promotional singles

Other appearances

Music videos

See also

Footnotes

References

Pop music discographies
Discographies of American artists